The Cable Building is located at 611 Broadway at the northwest corner with Houston Street in NoHo and Greenwich Village, in Manhattan, New York City. Since it spans a block, the Cable Building also has addresses of 2-18 West Houston Street and 178-188 Mercer Street.

Construction and design 

The Cable Building was built in 1892–1894. It is a steel and iron frame structure with brick, stone, and terra-cotta facing. It has a limestone base with a two-story arcade featuring show windows graced by iron spandrels and elegant keystones. It also has a prominent copper cornice with lions' faces, egg-and-dart moldings, and surmounting acanthus. It is believed to be the architectural firm McKim, Mead & White's first use of a complete steel frame in a commercial building.

In an article published on May 7, 1892 under the heading of "The Beginning of the Transformation of Broadway", the publication of record for New York real estate, the Real Estate Record and Builders Guide, reported, "At the northwest corner of Houston Street the Broadway Cable Railroad Company (Broadway & Seventh Avenue Railroad Company) is constructing its big power station and business building from the plans of McKim, Mead & White. The contracts for this work above the foundations are still to be set."

When it was completed, the Real Estate Record and Builders Guide enthused that the new Cable Building is "conspicuous among the modern buildings that are fast imparting a new and grander appearance to Broadway....its architecture expresses distinctly the highest achievement of the art in this country at this time...The exterior of this magnificent structure is a product of American genius adapted to the needs of American commercial interests and is influenced by the Italian Renaissance in its style and proportions." The publication further remarked that, with this example, "no excuse remains for building cheaply or meanly on any New York City property." The article noted that the Metropolitan Traction Company occupied the top two floors of the building and had the other six 20,000 square foot floors for lease, which it thought would be especially appealing to those businesses who had their natural centre in the wholesale dry goods district.

The Real Estate Record and Builders Guide gave special notice to the western entrance, saying: "Surmounting the charming and inviting entranceway is a round ornamental opening, making the centre to a group of two strongly modeled figures, which from their appearance and position are strongly suggestive in many ways of the Great Seal of the Empire State. These figures are 11 feet in height and are worthy of especial notice." Above this entrance are two flanking draped female figures, which were created by the distinguished Scottish-American sculptor J. Massey Rhind the oval window had a large clock in it as shown in photos from ca 1920. Like the architect Stanford White, Rhind was a leader in the "American Renaissance" movement. The figure on the right holds a sword her in hand,  the handle of which was broken off ca 1920s, it remained missing for decades until it was replaced incorrectly with a flame torch to match the figure on the left.

Architects

The Cable Building was designed by Stanford White, a partner in McKim, Mead & White, the preeminent American architectural firm at the turn of the twentieth century. It is a nine-story Beaux-Arts structure, which impressively captures White's design principles of the "American Renaissance". This is the only McKim, Mead & White building in the NoHo Historic District. The building's detailing is similar to two of the firm's earlier designs: the 1887 building at 900 Broadway, which Christopher Gray, writing in the New York Times called a "sleek, sophisticated amalgam of industrial-style brickwork"; and the long-gone 1890 Hotel Imperial, also built for the Goelet family, at Broadway and 32nd Street. Stanford White was the partner in charge for both of these projects for the family and was a close friend.

The Cable Building's dual use as both a major powerhouse and an approximately 140,000 square-foot modern office building appears unique in the McKim, Mead & White portfolio. The firm, however, designed two other significant power house structures, both in New York State: the Adams Power Plant Transformer House, part of the historic Edward Dean Adams Power Plant, the first large-scale, alternating current electric generating plant in the world, built in 1895 to tap the power of Niagara Falls; and the IRT Powerhouse, the power station of the Interborough Rapid Transit Company, located further uptown in Hell's Kitchen. However, both of these structures were single use, and most of McKim, Mead & White's prolific output was for public buildings or grand houses. Besides the Goelet Building among its few other office buildings is the Gorham Building, an Italian Renaissance Revival palazzo-style building at 390 Fifth Avenue at 36th Street in Murray Hill, for which Stanford White as also the partner-in-charge; and the New York Life Building in Kansas City, Missouri, which was fully replicated in Omaha, Nebraska as the Omaha National Bank Building. The latter two buildings are believed to be the only example in the McKim, Mead & White portfolio where one set of plans spawned two identical buildings.

Of the twenty-nine American cities that built cable traction systems between 1870 and 1900 along with their accompanying cable powerhouses, this is the only powerhouse that was built by an architect of such stature, creating a building of enduring artistic refinement. A cable car powerhouse is usually a very utilitarian building, constructed for one clear purpose, as can be seen clearly in the LaSalle Street Cable Car Powerhouse in Chicago, or the Baltimore City Passenger Railway Power House and Car Barn. It was simply the mechanical back office of the cable railroad. In this instance, being situated on such a prominent street, Broadway, probably propelled the investors, with deep ties to New York business and real estate, to make a grand statement.

Tenant

The Cable Building was originally the headquarters and power station for the Metropolitan Traction Company, one of the city's cable car companies.  MTC had been assembled in 1892 as a holding company for street railways, including the Broadway & Seventh Avenue Railroad. It was composed of a very powerful quartet, including the patriarch of the Whitney family, William Collins Whitney; an extremely wealthy financier, Thomas Fortune Ryan; Philadelphia industrialist Peter Arrell Brown Widener; and a major New York builder, John D. Crimmins. Their original investment in the building was $750,000. In all MTC spent $12 million on a cable car railway system to move cars on Broadway from Bowling Green to 36th Street. It was the most expensive system on a per-mile basis of any in the nation. When it became operational in the summer of 1893, its fleet comprised 125 cable cars and served 100,000 daily passengers. This was the central power station; other stations were at 51st Street and Front Street.

The building's basement, which had been excavated 46' under the street surface, housed four 32-foot winding wheels that carried the cables that pulled the cable streetcars. They were powered by four Corliss steam engines 38" x 60", 1200 HP each, developed by the Dickson Manufacturing Company of Scranton, Pennsylvania. The upper seven floors contained offices arranged around a large internal court with two rectangular light wells.

Less than ten years after it was finished and occupied, cable traction became obsolete in 1901 and the company switched to electricity, but the building retained its original name.  The last Broadway cable car left the Battery Station at 8:27 PM on May 21, 1901. Its final journey marked the end of cable street transportation in New York City. Subsequently, the Metropolitan Traction Company went into receivership, and was reorganized the following year as the New York Railways Company.

Recent history

The New York Railways Company sold the building in 1925, and it was soon occupied by small businesses and manufacturers. From the 1940s to 1970s, the Cable Building housed mainly garment makers, which was the prevailing use in that area at the time. It was converted back to offices in 1983, with new ground-floor storefronts. M. D. Carlisle Real Estate has owned The Cable Building since 1985.

The basement space that originally contained the cable powerhouse became the Angelika Film Center. They operate a multi-screen theater, which specializes in art house films. It was designed by architect Igor Josza and built by contractor Don Schimenti in 1989. Part of the ground floor and all of the second floor has been occupied since 2002 by a 40,217 square-foot Crate & Barrel store. Offices tenant the other seven floors.

Historic preservation

The building was designated as part of the NoHo Historic District in 1999 by the New York City Landmarks Preservation Commission. The report stated:

However, the Cable Building is not currently listed in its own right on the National Register of Historic Places.

References

External links
 

1894 establishments in New York (state)
Beaux-Arts architecture in New York City
Broadway (Manhattan)
Cable car railways in the United States
Cableways on the National Register of Historic Places
Greenwich Village
McKim, Mead & White buildings
New York City Designated Landmarks in Manhattan
Office buildings completed in 1894
Office buildings in Manhattan
Stanford White buildings
Transportation buildings and structures on the National Register of Historic Places in New York City